The Cleveland Squash Classic 2013 is the women's edition of the 2013 Cleveland Classic, which is a tournament of the WSA World Tour event International (Prize money : 50 000 $). The event took place at the Cleveland Racket Club in Cleveland, Ohio in United States from 2 February to 5 February. Raneem El Weleily won her first Cleveland Classic trophy, beating Nicol David in the final.

Prize money and ranking points
For 2013, the prize purse was $50,000. The prize money and points breakdown is as follows:

Seeds

Draw and results

See also
Cleveland Classic
WSA World Tour 2013

References

External links
WSA Cleveland Classic 2013 website
Cleveland Classic 2013 Squashsite website

Women's Cleveland Classic
Women's Cleveland Classic
2013 in American sports
Cleveland Classic